Lashar District is a district (bakhsh) in Nik Shahr County, Sistan and Baluchestan Province, Iran. At the 2006 census, its population was 37,073, in 8,153 families.  The district has one city: Espakeh. The district has three rural districts (dehestan): Chanef Rural District, Lashar-e Jonubi Rural District, and Lashar-e Shomali Rural District.

Etymology
The name Lashar derives from the son of Mir Jalal Khan, Mir Lashar Khan, ruler of the territory in the 12th century.

References 

Nik Shahr County
Districts of Sistan and Baluchestan Province